Carlos R. Bell (born September 21, 1947) is a former American football running back, fullback, and tight end who played one season in the National Football League for the New Orleans Saints in 1971. He also played for the Richmond Roadrunners/Saints of the Atlantic Coast Football League.

Early life
Carlos Bell was born on September 21, 1947 in Clinton, Oklahoma. He went to high school at Clinton (OK).

College career
Bell went to college at Houston. In 1967 he had 14 rushes for 139 yards and 2 touchdowns. In 1968 he had 107 rushes for 691 yards and 5 touchdowns.

Career college statistics

Professional career

Richmond Roadrunner/Saints
Bell had his first season in 1969. He was with the Richmond Roadrunners of the Atlantic Coast Football League. He scored two touchdowns in 1969. In 1970, the Roadrunners were renamed the Saints. With the Saints he had 113 rushes for 449 yards and two touchdowns. He also had 13 receptions for 148 yards and two touchdowns. He scored 6 touchdowns with the Roadrunners/Saints.

New Orleans Saints
In 1971 he was drafted in the 4th round (82nd overall) by the New Orleans Saints. He played in one game for them. He played as a tight end. He did not play anymore after 1971.

Career Professional statistics

References

1947 births
Living people
Houston Cougars football players
New Orleans Saints players
American football tight ends
American football running backs